The 2020 Munster Senior Football Championship Final was played at Páirc Uí Chaoimh in Cork on 22 November 2020. It was contested by Tipperary and Cork. Tipperary won a first title since 1935, doing so in the home ground of their opponent. This was also the first time since 1992 that neither Cork nor Kerry won the competition.

Pre-match
The game was held amid the COVID-19 pandemic in the Republic of Ireland, which also led to the delayed championship.

To mark the centenary of Bloody Sunday, Tipperary wore special commemorative jerseys in white and green for the game, a replica of the colours worn by the Tipperary team which played Dublin at Croke Park in 1920.

Former under-21 footballer of the year and professional Australian rules footballer Colin O'Riordan was named in the team.

Match details

Post-match
The result meant Tipperary qualified for a repeat of the 2016 All-Ireland Senior Football Championship semi-final against Mayo. Mayo won, to qualify for the 2020 All-Ireland Senior Football Championship Final. 

Tipp captain Conor Sweeney laid a wreath at the Bloody Sunday memorial at Croke Park on Hill 16 after the game against Mayo.

Notes

References

2M Final
Munster Championship
Munster Senior Football Championship Finals
Cork county football team matches
Tipperary county football team matches